Air Namibia (Pty) Limited, which traded as Air Namibia, was the national airline of Namibia, headquartered in the country's capital, Windhoek. It operated scheduled domestic, regional, and international passenger and cargo services, having its international hub in Windhoek Hosea Kutako International Airport and a domestic hub at the smaller Windhoek Eros Airport. , the carrier was wholly owned by the Namibian government. Air Namibia was a member of both the International Air Transport Association and the African Airlines Association.

History

Early years 

Using Ryan Navion aircraft, this carrier started operations in 1949 linking Windhoek with Grootfontein. Charter and cargo flights were also undertaken. In 1950, the company started feeder services for South African Airways. By 1958, a fleet of seven Ryan Navions and one de Havilland Dragon Rapide served a route network that included Grootfontein, Tsumeb, Otjiwarongo, Outjo, Swakopmund, Walvis Bay and Windhoek. On 26 March 1959, SWAT merged with Oryx Aviation — a small passenger airline established three years earlier— to form South West Airways. IATA membership was gained later that year.

Namibair, set up as a charter airline in 1963, became a subsidiary company of Suidwes Lugdiens in 1966. In 1969, Safmarine acquired a 50% stake in Suidwes, eventually boosting its participation to 85%. At , the Suidwes fleet comprised four Piper Aztecs, one de Havilland Canada DHC-2 Beaver, two Piper PA-28 Cherokees, one Cessna 182, one Cessna 205, one Cessna 206, one Cessna 402, three Douglas DC-3s and five Piper PA-30 Twin Comanches; at this time the carrier had 45 employees. A Fairchild-Hiller FH-227 was acquired in 1974, and a Convair 580 was later incorporated into the fleet to perform charter flights carrying miners to their jobs in Grootfontein and Tsumeb.

Suidwes merged into Namib Air on 1 December 1978. The South West African government became the major shareholder in 1982. Following the creation of the South West Africa National Transport Corporation in 1986, Namib Air took over all air transport operations in the country. The airline was designated as the country's flag carrier in 1987. That year, two 19-seater Beech 1900s were bought. In 1988, the company was incorporated into the Namibian state-owned holding company Transnamib. On 6 August 1989, a Boeing 737-200 leased from South African Airways that flew the Windhoek–Johannesburg route inaugurated the carrier's jet era. In  the same year, a third Beech 1900 was incorporated into the fleet.

Services to Lusaka and Luanda were launched in 1990 and 1991, respectively. The early 1990s also saw the launch of long-haul services to Europe: the Windhoek–Frankfurt route started being flown in 1991 twice a week using a Boeing 747SP, and London was included into the route network in 1992, with a non-stop flight. In 1993, services to Frankfurt, which were served twice-weekly, were also extended to London. LTU, Germany's second largest airline at the time, entered into a codeshare agreement with Air Namibia in February 1998. Named Welwitschia, the aircraft was handed over by the manufacturer in  that year. The new machine came to replace the carrier's Boeing 747SP, and was retired in 2004. That year, the carrier started flying the McDonnell Douglas MD-11.

Developments since the 2000s 

By , the airline's employees numbered 418. At this time, Air Namibia operated a Boeing 727-100, two Boeing 737-200 Advanced, one Boeing 747-400 Combi and three Raytheon Beech 1900Cs that served Cape Town, Frankfurt, Johannesburg, London, Luanda, Luderitz, Lusaka, Maun, Mokuti Lodge, Mpacha, Ondangwa, Oranjemund, Swakopmund, Victoria Falls, Walvis Bay and Windhoek. That year, the airline joined the African Airlines Association.

Of the last two A319s ordered, the first one was incorporated into the fleet in early . In , Air Namibia took delivery of its first Airbus A330-200.

In , the airline was granted permission to fly to the United States by the US Department of Transportation. In March the airline completed a re-certification application by the International Civil Aviation Organisation (an audit process which was initiated in 2013), enabling the airline to fly to any EU member state.

 the Transportation Commission of Namibia has suspended the carrier's Scheduled Air Services Licence, citing financial and safety concerns. In October 2020 the airline has been given notice by Belgian lawyer Anicet Baum, of the company Challengair, in claiming that Air Namibia is insolvent and that it is unable to re-pay its debts to Challengeair (an amount of 18,s million Euro), which was settled to be repaid in instalments until September 2021.

On 11 February 2021, the Namibian government announced the immediate shutdown and liquidation of Air Namibia due to overwhelming debt and years of financial dependence from the state. At the time of closure, the airline operated nine aircraft and employed approx. 600 staff.

In late October 2021, a South African aviation company offered 3.2 billion Namibian dollars to purchase the airline.

Destinations 

, the route network comprised 18 destinations and 19 airports in nine different countries in Africa and Europe, with seven of these destinations being domestic ones.

Codeshare agreements
Air Namibia codeshared with the following airlines, :
 Condor
 Ethiopian Airlines
 Kenya Airways
 Turkish Airlines

Fleet

Final fleet
The Air Namibia fleet consisted of the following aircraft (as of August 2019):

Fleet development
In recent developments regarding the Embraer ERJ-135-fleet, Westair Aviation, a 100% Namibian-owned company, acquired the four aircraft from the previous owner, Air France. According to the new owners, Westair would've enabled the upgrade and renewal of the domestic and regional fleet. In August 2017 the airline confirmed that it was committed to purchasing 2 new Embraer ERJ-135 and 4 new Embraer ERJ-145 jets, for delivery 2018 However none of those were ever delivered prior to the airline's demise.

Former fleet

The company previously operated the following aircraft:

 Airbus A340-300
 ATR 42
 Beechcraft 1900D
 Boeing 727
 Boeing 737-200
 Boeing 737-200C
 Boeing 737-500
 Boeing 737-800
 Boeing 747SP
 Boeing 747-400
 Boeing 747-400 Combi
 Boeing 767-300ER
 Cessna 182
 Cessna 210
 Cessna 310
 Cessna 402
 Cessna 404
 Cessna 414
 Convair 580
 Douglas C-47A
 Douglas C-47B
 Douglas C-54A
 Douglas C-54B
 DHC-8-300
 Douglas DC-4
 Douglas DC-6B
 Fairchild Hiller FH-227
 Fokker F-28-3000
 Fokker F-28-4000
 HS 748 Series 2A
 Indonesian Aerospace CN-235
 McDonnell Douglas MD-11
 Piper PA-31 Navajo
 Piper PA-34 Seneca

See also 
 List of airlines of Namibia
 List of defunct airlines of Namibia
 Transport in Namibia

Notes

References

Bibliography

External links 

 

Defunct airlines of Namibia
Airlines established in 1946
Airlines disestablished in 2021
Government-owned airlines
Government-owned companies of Namibia
Companies based in Windhoek
Namibian brands
1946 establishments in South West Africa
2021 disestablishments in Namibia